Mormon timeline may refer to

 Mormon timeline (19th century)
 Mormon timeline (20th century)
 Mormon timeline (21st century) 

Mormon studies